The men's sprint competition at the 2021 FIL World Luge Championships was held on 29 January 2021.

Results
The qualification was held at 09:00 and the final at 12:49.

References

Men's sprint